Bo is a tambon (subdistrict) of Khlung District, in Chanthaburi Province, Thailand. In 2017 it had a total population of 7,213 people.

Administration

Central administration
The tambon is subdivided into 10 administrative villages (muban).

Local administration
The whole area of the subdistrict is covered by the subdistrict municipality (Thesaban Tambon) Bo (เทศบาลตำบลบ่อ).

References

External links
Thaitambon.com on Bo

Tambon of Chanthaburi Province